The 2001–02 BCAFL was the 17th full season of the British Collegiate American Football League, organised by the British Students American Football Association.

Changes from last season
Division Changes
There were no changes to the Divisional setup

Team Changes
Bristol Bullets changed their name to David Chorley Bullets
University of Essex joined the Southern Conference, as the Blades
Plymouth University joined the Southern Conference, as the Blitz
Reading Knights moved within the Southern Conference from Western to Central Division
This increased the number of teams in BCAFL to 29.

Regular season

Northern Conference, Scottish Division

Northern Conference, Eastern Division

Northern Conference, Central Division

Southern Conference, Eastern Division

Southern Conference, Central Division

Southern Conference, Western Division

Playoffs

Note – the table does not indicate who played home or away in each fixture.

References

External links
 Official BUAFL Website
 Official BAFA Website

2001
2001 in British sport
2002 in British sport
2001 in American football
2002 in American football